Träume sind stärker is a pop/rock album by the Austrian band Schürzenjäger. It was released in 1996 by BMG Ariola Media GmbH.

Track listing
 Träume sind stärker ("Dreams are stronger") – Müssig/Kunze – 4:51
 's braucht net viel ("It doesn't need much") – Müssig/C. Leis-Bendorff – 3:31
 Am Sonntag in der Kirch'n ("Sunday at church") – Müssig/Kunze – 3:23
 Der große kleine Mann ("The great small man") – Müssig/C. Leis-Bendorff – 2:52
 Wenn i oamal nimmer bin ("If I'm once gone") – Keinrath/Spitzer – 3:$9
 Junge Spinner ("Young fools") – Moll/Greiner – 4:01
 Des taugt ma ("That suits me") – Müssig – 4:17
 G'sundheit (Darauf drink ma oan) ("Cheers! (We drink to that))" – Müssig/C. Leis-Bendorff/Eberharter/Pfister/Steinlechner – 2:27
 I werd dasein ("I'll be there") – Müssig – 5:55
 Sie braucht koa Musik, um zu tanz'n ("She doesn't need music to dance") – Müssig/C. Leis-Bendorff – 3:56
 Bei dir ("With you") – Gorgoglione/Müssig – 4:23
 Abel & Kain ("Abel and Cain") – Müssig – 4:22
 Sollt' halt net so bleib'n ("It shouldn't be like that") – Müssig/C. Leis-Bendorff – 3:49
 Sollt' halt net so bleib'n (Instrumental) – 2:59

Charts

References

1996 albums